Three-time defending champion Pete Sampras defeated Patrick Rafter in the final, 6–7(10–12), 7–6(7–5), 6–4, 6–2 to win the gentlemen's singles tennis title at the 2000 Wimbledon Championships. It was Sampras' seventh Wimbledon title and 13th Grand Slam title overall. The win equaled William Renshaw's all-time record of Wimbledon titles, and was an Open Era record in the Gentleman's Singles until 2017, when Roger Federer won his eighth title. His victory also meant he surpassed Roy Emerson as the overall leader in men's major singles titles.

With his first round victory against Greg Rusedski, Vince Spadea ended his 21-match losing streak, the longest such streak in the Open Era.

Seeds

  Pete Sampras (champion)
  Andre Agassi (semifinals)
  Magnus Norman (second round)
  Gustavo Kuerten (third round)
  Yevgeny Kafelnikov (second round)
  Cédric Pioline (second round)
  Lleyton Hewitt (first round)
  Tim Henman (fourth round)
  Thomas Enqvist (fourth round)
  Mark Philippoussis (quarterfinals)
  Richard Krajicek (second round)
  Pat Rafter (final)
  Nicolas Kiefer (first round)
  Greg Rusedski (first round)
  Marat Safin (second round)
  Nicolás Lapentti (first round)

Qualifying

Draw

Finals

Top half

Section 1

Section 2

Section 3

Section 4

Bottom half

Section 5

Section 6

Section 7

Section 8

References

External links

 2000 Wimbledon Championships – Men's draws and results at the International Tennis Federation

Men's Singles
Wimbledon Championship by year – Men's singles